Edness Kimball Wilkins (January 31, 1896 − July 15, 1980) was the first female speaker of the Wyoming House of Representatives.

Life 
She was born Edness Kimball to parents Wilson, mayor of Casper, and Edness Merrick Kimball in Casper, Wyoming, on January 31, 1896.  She studied at both the University of Nebraska and the University of Kentucky. She was married to Ronald Wilkins, and together they had one son. During her life she was an active member of the League of Women Voters.

Career 

She worked as an assistant for Nellie Tayloe Ross, the first woman to be governor of a US state, from 1931 to 1935 when Ross was director of the US Mint. Later, Wilkins ran the Water and Sanitation Department for Casper, Wyoming, from 1950 to 1953.

In 1954, Wilkins was elected for the first time to the Wyoming House of Representatives to represent Natrona County. She went on to serve five more terms in the state legislature.

Wilkins was originally rejected as Speaker, and instead Walter B. Phelan was elected Speaker of the House in 1965, despite the fact that Wilkins was leader of the majority party, the Democrats. At the time, she commented she was used to "stepping aside for the men". When Phelan died in 1966, as the leader of the majority party, Wilkins assumed the office of Speaker. However, because the House met only on odd numbered years and the next year Wilkins was elected to the State Senate, she never actually served in session as speaker.

In 1966, Wilkins ran for and won election to the Wyoming State Senate. She lost her bid for reelection in 1970. In 1972, she again won election to the Wyoming House of Representatives, and she continued to serve there until her death on July 15, 1980.

Legacy 
The Edness K. Wilkins State Park near Casper, Wyoming, was named for Wilkins.

See also 
 Speaker of the Wyoming House of Representatives

References 

20th-century American politicians
Democratic Party Wyoming state senators
Politicians from Casper, Wyoming
Speakers of the Wyoming House of Representatives
Democratic Party members of the Wyoming House of Representatives
Women in Wyoming politics
1896 births
1980 deaths
20th-century American women politicians